Folketing elections were held in Denmark on 7 June 1864. The National Liberal Party emerged as the largest faction, winning 40 of the 101 seats. Following the elections, Christian Albrecht Bluhme became Prime Minister on 7 July.

Electoral system
The elections were held using first-past-the-post voting in single-member constituencies. Only 14% of the population was eligible to vote in the elections, with suffrage restricted to men over 30 who were not receiving poor relief (or who had not paid back any previous poor relief received), were not classed as "dependents" (those who were privately employed but did not have a household) and who had lived in their constituency for a certain length of time.

Results

References

1864 in Denmark
Elections in Denmark
Denmark
Denmark